Skip James Holm (born February 22, 1944) is a retired pilot who lives in Calabasas, California, USA.

Holm claims to hold the world record for combat flight hours: 1,172. He retired from the U.S. Air Force Reserve in 1992, with the rank of lieutenant colonel. He logged his combat hours flying F-105s and F-4s in the Vietnam War. After three tours of duty in Vietnam, he joined Lockheed Skunk Works and test piloted the experimental and production F-117s.

Holm participated in the Reno Air Races since 1981. He has won in the Unlimited class of piston-engined aircraft in 1984, 2000, 2002 and 2003. Holm performed as stand-in pilot in The Right Stuff and Hot Shots!

Personal life

Holm was married to actress P. J. Soles from 1983 to 1998. They have a son named Sky (born in 1983) and a daughter named Ashley (born in 1988).

References

Books
 Robert Gandt, Fly Low Fly Fast: Inside the Reno Air Races (1999)

External links
Official site

1944 births
Living people
United States Air Force personnel of the Vietnam War
United States Air Force officers
United States Air Force reservists